In the study of permutation patterns, there has been considerable interest in enumerating specific permutation classes, especially those with relatively few basis elements. This area of study has turned up unexpected instances of Wilf equivalence, where two seemingly-unrelated permutation classes have the same numbers of permutations of each length.

Classes avoiding one pattern of length 3 

There are two symmetry classes and a single Wilf class for single permutations of length three.

Classes avoiding one pattern of length 4 

There are seven symmetry classes and three Wilf classes for single permutations of length four.

No non-recursive formula counting 1324-avoiding permutations is known.
 have provided lower and upper bounds for the growth of this class.

Classes avoiding two patterns of length 3 

Classes avoiding one pattern of length 3 and one of length 4 

There are eighteen symmetry classes and nine Wilf classes, all of which have been enumerated.

Classes avoiding two patterns of length 4 

There are 56 symmetry classes and 38 Wilf equivalence classes.

Heatmaps of each of the non-finite classes are shown on the right. The lexicographically minimal symmetry is used for each class, and the classes are ordered in lexicographical order. To create each heatmap 1,000,000 permutations of length 300 are sampled uniformly at random from the class. The color of the point  represents how many permutations have value  at index . Higher resolution versions can be obtained on PermPal

External links
The Database of Permutation Pattern Avoidance, maintained by Bridget Tenner, contains details of the enumeration of many other permutation classes with relatively few basis elements.

See also 
 Baxter permutation
 Riffle shuffle permutation

References 
.
.
.
.
.
.
.
.
.
.
.
.
.
.
.
.
.
.
.
.
.
.
.
 .
.
.
.
.
 .
.
.
.
.
.
.
.

Enumerative combinatorics
Permutation patterns